Hercules Erasmus is a South African rugby league footballer who represented his country in the 2000 World Cup.

References

Living people
South African rugby league players
South Africa national rugby league team players
Rugby league locks
Year of birth missing (living people)
Place of birth missing (living people)